Forest Hills High School, located in Sidman, Pennsylvania, is a small, rural, public high school. In 2014, enrollment was reported as 454 pupils in 10th through 12th grades.

The principal is Kaitlin Stiffler. It once was composed of 4 high schools before their unification to Forest Hills in 1966. The 4 high schools were: Triangle Area, Adams-Summerhill, South Fork-Croyle, and Beaverdale-Wilmore. The district encompasses 3 townships: Adams, Croyle, and Summerhill.

Forest Hills High School students may choose to attend Greater Johnstown Career and Technology Center for training in the construction and mechanical trades as well as other careers. The Appalachia Intermediate Unit IU8 provides the School with a wide variety of services like specialized education for disabled students and hearing, background checks for employees, state mandated recognizing and reporting child abuse training, speech and visual disability services and professional development for staff and faculty.

Extracurriculars
The Forest Hills High School offers a wide variety of clubs, activities and an extensive, publicly funded sports program.

Sports
The District funds
Varsity

Boys
Baseball - AA
Basketball- AAA
Cross Country - AA
Football - AA
Golf - AA
Rifle - AAAA
Soccer - AA
Tennis - AA
Track and Field - AA
Volleyball - AA
Wrestling - AA

Girls
Basketball - AAA
Cross Country - AA
Golf - AA
Rifle - AAAA
Soccer (Fall) - AA
Softball - AA
Girls' Tennis - AA
Track and Field - AA
Volleyball - AA

Notable alumni
 Shawn Hillegas, former Major League Baseball pitcher
 Joe Jones, former NFL player
Walter Prozialeck Scientist, Biomedical Educator

References

External links

 Official website

Public high schools in Pennsylvania
Schools in Cambria County, Pennsylvania
1966 establishments in Pennsylvania